Club Atlético Goes is a Uruguayan professional basketball team located in Montevideo, Uruguay. The team competes in the Liga Uruguaya de Basketball.

Current roster

Notable players
To appear in this section a player must have either:
- Set a club record or won an individual award as a professional player.
- Played at least one official international match for his senior national team at any time.
 Fernando Martinez
 Sebastián Vázquez
 David Nesbitt
 Calvin Warner

References

External links
Presentation at Latinbasket.com

Basketball teams in Uruguay
Basketball teams in Montevideo
Basketball teams established in 1934